High in the Rockies: A Live Album is Jason Boland & The Stragglers' second live album. It was released in April 2010. The recordings come from four live concerts over four days from January 7, 2010 to January 10, 2010. The shows were performed in Steamboat Springs, Colorado, Ft. Collins, Colorado, Laramie, Wyoming, and Denver, Colorado, respectively.

Track listing
"Hank" (Aaron Wynne) - 3:17
"No Reason Being Late" (Jason Boland) - 3:09
"Alright" (Boland, Cody Canada) - 3:15
"Comal County Blue" (Boland) - 4:24
"Bourbon Legend" (Boland, Pete Anderson, Drew Kennedy) - 3:07
"Tulsa Time" (Danny Flowers) - 3:43
"Backslider Blues" (Boland) - 5:25
"Down Here On Earth" (Boland) - 2:58
"No One Left To Blame" (Boland, Anderson) - 3:51
"Bottle By My Bed" (Boland) - 4:36
"Gallo Del Cielo" (Tom Russell) - 6:41
"Blowing Through The Hills" (Boland) - 4:04
"Time In Hell" (Boland, Anderson) - 4:23
"Jesus and Ruger" (Boland) - 3:49
"Up and Gone" (Boland, Anderson) - 3:37
"Rainbow Stew" (Merle Haggard) - 2:45
"The Party's Not Over" (Boland, Roger Ray) - 3:47
"If I Ever Get Back (To Oklahoma)" (Boland) - 4:10
"Outlaw Band" (Bob Childers, Randy Crouch, Layle Stagner) - 5:10

Personnel
 Jason Boland - acoustic guitar, electric guitar, lead vocals
 Noah Jeffries - fiddle, mandolin, background vocals
 Roger Ray - dobro, electric guitar, steel guitar
 Brad Rice - drums, background vocals
 Grant Tracy - bass guitar

Chart performance

References

Jason Boland & The Stragglers albums
2010 live albums